Major-General Sir Arthur Reginald Hoskins,  (30 May 1871 – 7 February 1942) was a senior British Army officer of the First World War.

Early life
Hoskins was born in London on 30 May 1871, the son of Thomas Hoskins. He was educated at Westminster School before attending the Royal Military College, Sandhurst.

Career
Hoskins commissioned into the North Staffordshire Regiment on 23 May 1891, was promoted to lieutenant on 9 January 1895, and in 1896 was posted to the Egyptian Army. He first saw active service in the Dongola Expedition that same year, and also fought in the Mahdist War between 1897 and 1899, during which he was Mentioned in Dispatches. In late November 1899 he took part in the operations leading to the defeat of the Khalifa, and for his services in the Sudan he received a notice for consideration on future promotion. He was also made a member of the Order of the Medjidie (4th Class) in 1899.

In February 1900 he relinquished his appointment with the Egyptian Army, and joined the 2nd battalion of his regiment which had just embarked for service in the Second Boer War in South Africa. He was promoted captain on 20 March 1900, received the brevet promotion to major the following day, and served as an intelligence officer, and as aide-de-camp to Major-General John Maxwell, military governor of Pretoria after the annexation of that city. For his service during the war, he received the Distinguished Service Order (DSO), and was noted for future staff employment. Hoskins left Cape Town for the United Kingdom in late October 1902, and was back with his regiment the following month. He soon returned to Africa however, when he fought in the Somaliland Campaign in 1903 and was again mentioned in despatches. Later the same year he entered the Staff College, Camberley.

After passing out of Camberley in 1905 he served as a staff officer in Egypt and at the Staff College. In August 1913 he returned to East Africa as inspector of the Kings African Rifles. In September 1914 Hoskins was recalled from East Africa and was appointed assistant adjutant and quartermaster general of the 8th Division, engaged at the time on the Western Front. On 12 November 1914 he became chief of staff to Major-General Sir Thompson Capper. On 25 March 1915 Hoskins was promoted brigadier-general and given command of the 8th Brigade. In early 1916 he was transferred to the East African Campaign as commander of the 1st East African Division. In the 1916 Birthday Honours Hoskins was made a Companion of the Order of St Michael and St George.

Hoskins became Commander-in-Chief of British forces in East Africa on 20 January 1917, succeeding General Jan Smuts. When he took command, the British offensive had stalled, with the troops badly supplied and falling sick in large numbers. Hoskins reorganised the transport and medical services and improved the lines of communication, intending to renew the offensive when the unusually heavy rains ended. Although he achieved much, he did not have the confidence of the Chief of the Imperial General Staff, General Sir William Robertson, who considered that Hoskins "had lost his grip of the operations" and replaced him with the South African Jacob van Deventer on 23 April 1917.

Hoskins served for the remainder of the war as the commander of the 3rd (Lahore) Division in Mesopotamia and Palestine. He was made a Knight Commander of the Order of the Bath in the 1919 Birthday Honours and was awarded the Order of the Nile (2nd Class) in November 1919. He was also made a member of the Russian Order of Saint Anna (2nd Class, with swords). His final military appointment was as the general officer commanding, 46th (North Midland) Division from June 1919 to June 1923.

From 1921 until 1936 Hoskins was Honorary Colonel of the North Staffordshire Regiment.

He retired from the army in 1923 and became involved in Conservative Party politics. He was principal of the Philip Stott College, Overstone in 1928 and then principal of the Bonar Law Memorial College from 1928 to 1938. Both institutions were responsible for training Conservative agents and local activists. Hoskins died in 1942.

References

Bibliography

1871 births
1942 deaths
Academics of the Staff College, Camberley
British Army major generals
British Army personnel of the Mahdist War
British Army generals of World War I
British Army personnel of the Second Boer War
Companions of the Distinguished Service Order
Companions of the Order of St Michael and St George
Graduates of the Royal Military College, Sandhurst
Graduates of the Staff College, Camberley
Knights Commander of the Order of the Bath
North Staffordshire Regiment officers
People educated at Westminster School, London
Recipients of the Order of the Medjidie, 4th class
Recipients of the Order of St. Anna, 2nd class
Military personnel from London